Hibbertia stenophylla is a species of flowering plant in the family Dilleniaceae and is endemic to Western Australia. It is a shrub with thick, linear to cylindrical leaves and yellow flowers with ten stamens in a single group on one side of two densely hairy carpels.

Description
There are ten stamens fused at the base on one side of the two densely hairy carpels that each contain three or four ovules.

Taxonomy
Hibbertia stenophylla was first formally described in 2002 Judith R. Wheeler in the journal Nuytsia from specimens collected by Michael Clyde Hislop in 1994, north-east of Kalannie. The specific epithet (stenophylla) means "narrow-leaved".

Distribution and habitat
This hibbertia grows in heathland and shrubland in the Avon Wheatbelt, Coolgardie, Geraldton Sandplains, Mallee, Murchison and Yalgoo biogeographic regions of Western Australia.

See also
List of Hibbertia species

References

stenophylla
Flora of Western Australia
Plants described in 2002